William Helmsley (died 1404), of York, was an English draper and Member of Parliament.

HE married twice. His first wife's name is unrecorded, but they had one son. It is assumed that she died at some point before Michaelmas 1370, by which point he was married to a woman named Alice. Together they had at least four sons and at least two daughters, and Alice died in 1401.

He was a Member (MP) of the Parliament of England for City of York in 1393.  He was Mayor of York 3 February 1394–5.

References

14th-century births
1404 deaths
14th-century English people
People from York
Lord Mayors of York
Members of the Parliament of England (pre-1707)